Eradu is a small town in Western Australia located in the Mid West region of Western Australia  east of Geraldton on the Geraldton–Mount Magnet Road.

Following the opening of the Nangulu-Mullewa railway line in 1894 a station was opened at the location of the current town-site. The name of the station was Greenough River until 1903. It remained a station with a station master from 1915 to 1921 and was gazetted as a town in 1920. The station later became a siding until it was closed in 1973.

The name is Aboriginal in origin and is the name of a pool found in the nearby Greenough River.

Eradu was a coal mining town, and the mine was situated 50m from the town post office, located at the railway track junction. When the coal supply ran out, the townsfolk moved out to find other work, leaving the infrastructure behind.

The old post office was adopted as housing, with the old coal mine being turned into a rubbish tip. The post office still stands, but it is not in use as either a post office or housing anymore. The old coal mine eventually filled up with rubbish and was filled in and closed.

Daniel "Chook" Roth was one of the people living in the old post office, up until near the year 1997. He earned his nickname one day when his elder brother chased some chickens into the old mine (rubbish tip), and due to his love of the birds, he threatened to dob him in to their mother unless his brother climbed down into the mine to save them.

References